The Impression 5 Science Center, is a science museum located in downtown Lansing, Michigan.  Formerly known as the Impression 5 Museum, the center is located in a historic wagon works factory on the Grand River.  The name, Impression 5, refers to the five senses. The Impression 5 Science Center has ~3,000 Visitors per week.

History
The Impression 5 Science Center was founded by Marilynne Eichinger in her basement in Lansing, Michigan, in 1972. Eichinger graduated with a BA in sociology/anthropology from Boston University and an MA in counseling psychology from Michigan State University. As a mother of five she was influenced by the Montessori education her children received as well as the writings of Jean Piaget and Howard Gardner. Much of her life was surrounded by family and friends involved in physics and engineering and Eichinger became interested in developing a way to explain scientific principles that appeared so complex in a way that the general public could understand.  She promoted the design and development of hands-on exhibits that challenged visitors thinking processes. The initial goal of Impression 5 was to develop fun, educational exhibits that focused on the five senses. A variety of approaches was offered to take into account individual learning styles.

The museum's first headquarters were in Marble School, East Lansing where volunteers housed displays and traveled to schools and shopping malls putting on small science exhibitions. In 1973 a 15,000 sq.ft warehouse was rented and filled with a variety of interactive displays. Over time, the museum was able to attract national attention along with funding for permanent and traveling exhibitions.  It was not long before the museum ran out of space in the small warehouse.  Impression 5 moved into its current 80,000 square foot building located on Museum Drive in downtown Lansing in 1982. It now offers  classes, camps, teacher training workshops and traveling school programs that complement the exhibitions within its building. In 1994 the Impression 5 Museum changed its name to the current, Impression 5 Science Center.

Exhibits
Current Exhibits
 Chew On This!
 Spectrum
 Nano
 Build Zone
 MI Nature
 First Impression Room
 POP! A Bubble Experience
 Electricity & Magnetism
 Simple Machines
 Giant Eye
 Spin
 Throwing Things
 FLOW: A Water Experience
 Rotating Traveling Exhibits
Smash: A Nuclear Adventure
Think Tank

See also
 List of Museums in Michigan
 Lansing, Michigan Museums
 Science museum
 Children's museum

References

External links
 Impression 5 Science Center (official site)

Museums in Lansing, Michigan
Children's museums in Michigan
Science museums in Michigan
1972 establishments in Michigan